is a Japanese manga artist. She is best known as the creator of the manga series Beastars, for which she has won the 2018 Manga Taishō, a Tezuka Osamu Cultural Prize, a Kodansha Manga Award, and a Japan Media Arts Festival Award. She is the daughter of manga artist Keisuke Itagaki.

Biography
Itagaki began painting in kindergarten, and started drawing manga in the second grade. As a teenager she developed the character Legoshi, an anthropomorphic wolf who would later appear in her manga series Beastars. She cites Disney movies and the artists Nicolas de Crécy and Egon Schiele as among her early influences.

She later attended Musashino Art University, where she studied filmmaking. She continued to pursue manga as a hobby while in university, creating dōjinshi that she would sell at dōjinshi conventions. After being unable to find a job in the film industry, Itagaki submitted her dōjinshi to editors at the publishing company Akita Shoten, which began publishing her short story collection Beast Complex in Weekly Shōnen Champion in 2016. That same year, Weekly Shōnen Champion began serializing Itagaki's critically  and commercially acclaimed series Beastars.

In September 2019, Itagaki's autobiographical manga series Paruno Graffiti began serialization in Kiss.

In 2021, Itagaki launched a new manga series, titled Sanda, in the 34th issue of Weekly Shōnen Champion on July 21.

Personal life
Itagaki is highly private about her personal life and wears a chicken mask to obscure her face at all public appearances. Japanese tabloids reported in 2018 that Itagaki is the daughter of Keisuke Itagaki, the creator of the manga series Baki the Grappler; the claim was repeated in April 2019 by Le Monde. Itagaki confirmed these reports in a joint interview with her father in the September 2019 issue of Weekly Shonen Champion, stating that she did not wish to disclose her parentage until she was established in the manga industry in order to avoid accusations of nepotism.

Works

Serializations
  (serialized in Weekly Shōnen Champion, 2016–2019; 2021)
 Beastars (serialized in Weekly Shōnen Champion, 2016–2020)
  (serialized in Kiss, 2019–2020)
  (serialized in Weekly Manga Goraku, 2020–2021)
 Sanda (serialized in Weekly Shōnen Champion, 2021–present)

One-shots
  (published in Weekly Manga Goraku, 2018)
  (published in Monthly Comic Zenon, 2019)

Awards and nominations

|-
! rowspan="1" | 2017
| rowspan="6" |Beastars
| Male Readers
| Kono Manga ga Sugoi!
| 
| 
| 
|-
! rowspan="4" | 2018
| New Face Award
| Japan Media Arts Festival Awards, Manga Division
| rowspan=4; 
| 
| 
|-
| Grand Prize 
| Manga Taishō
|
| 
|-
| New Artist Prize
| Tezuka Osamu Cultural Prize
| 
| 
|-
| Best Shōnen Manga 
| Kodansha Manga Award
| 
| 
|-
! 2020
| Best U.S. Edition of International Material—Asia
| Eisner Award
| 
|
|

References

External links
 Paru Itagaki on Twitter 
 Paru Itagaki on Tumblr 
 

1993 births
Living people
Women manga artists
Manga artists from Tokyo
Winner of Kodansha Manga Award (Shōnen)
Manga Taishō
Winner of Tezuka Osamu Cultural Prize (New Artist Prize)
Japanese female comics artists
People from Tokyo
Female comics writers